A constitutional referendum was held in Azerbaijan on 26 September 2016. Voters were asked whether they approve of 29 constitutional amendments, with a separate vote on each one. All 29 amendments were approved by between 89% and 95% of voters. It created the office of the Vice President and extended the presidential term from five to seven years.

Background
President Ilham Aliyev issued a decree on 18 July 2016, amending several articles of the constitution. These were reviewed by the Constitutional Court, who approved them on 25 July. On 26 July Aliyev ordered that a referendum be held, as required by articles 152 and 153 of the constitution.

Results

Aftermath
Following the referendum, President Ilham Aliyev appointed his wife Mehriban Aliyeva as Vice-President.

References

2016 referendums
2016 in Azerbaijan
2016

September 2016 events in Asia
September 2016 events in Europe